Bad News is the debut album from British parody heavy metal group Bad News released in October 1987 by EMI. The album features a cover of the famous Queen song "Bohemian Rhapsody" and was produced by Queen's guitarist Brian May. "Bohemian Rhapsody" was released as a single along with music video created for it, written and directed by Adrian Edmondson, who portrays Vim Fuego in the group. The video was released as a video single by Picture Music International. In 2004, EMI re-released the album with a re-ordered track listing and with additions of tracks derived from the group's follow-up album The Cash In Compilation.

Track listing

Original release 
Side 1
 "Hey Hey Bad News" 5:22 (Vim Fuego)
 "Warriors of Ghengis Khan" 3:27 (Fuego)
 "Bohemian Rhapsody" (Freddie Mercury) 3:46
Side 2
 "Bad News" 3:11 (Fuego)
 "Masturbike" 2:20 (Dennis)
 "Drink Till I Die" 5:26 (Dennis)

1989 Rhino Records release 
 "Bad Dreams Rehearsal" 5:13
 "A.G.M." 4:24
 "Introducing The Band" 2:19
 "Bad News" 3:11
 "Hey Mr. Bassman" 2:00
 "Hey Mr. Drummer" 2:15
 "Masturbike" 2:20
 "Trousers" 3:49
 "Drink Till I Die" 5:26
 "Vim Is Angry" 2:09
 "Hey Hey Bad News" 5:22
 "Warriors Of Ghengis Khan" 3:27
 "Excaliber" 6:21 †
 "Bohemian Rhapsody" 3:46
 "Double Entendre" 3:35 †
 "Cashing In On Christmas" 4:09
 "Dividing Up The Spoils" 2:59

† indicates a track exclusive to the CD edition of the album.

2004 re-release 
 "Hey Hey Bad News" - 5:16
 "We Haven't Recorded Anything Yet" - 2:03
 "Warriors of Ghengis Kahn" - 3:25
 "Excalibur" - 6:21
 "Bohemian Rhapsody (Take 1)(Part)"  - 1:30
 "Bohemian Rhapsody" - 3:39
 "The Contract" - 2:59
 "Introducing the Band" - 2:00  
 "Bad News" - 3:35
 "Hey Mr Bassman" - 4:08
 "Masturbike" - 2:20
 "What Are You Going to Wear for Top of the Pops?" - 3:48
 "Drink Till I Die" - 3:35
 "Maybe We Should Plug the Guitars In" - 1:46
 "Pretty Woman" - 2:51
 "Life with Brian'' - 5:25 (Ade Edmondson And Brian May)
 "Bad Dreams" - 4:15
 "A.G.M." - 4:22
 "O'Levels" - 3:24
 "Double Entendre"  3:33
 "Cashing In On Christmas" (Dub) - 4:26
 "Cashing In On Christmas" - 4:07

Personnel

Bad News 
 Vim Fuego (aka Alan Metcalfe) - vocals, lead guitar, bass on "Warriors of Ghengis Khan"
 Den Dennis - rhythm guitar
 Colin Grigson - bass
 Spider Webb - drums

Additional personnel
 Brian May - Guitar on "Bad News", "Pretty Woman", "Drink Till I Die", "Life with Brian", "Cashing In on Christmas"

Production 
 Produced By Brian May & Vim Fuego
 Engineered By Pete Schwier
 Re-Mastering By Bill Inglot & Ken Perry

Notes 

1987 debut albums
Bad News (band) albums
Concept albums
EMI Records albums